Óscar Ramón Vargas (born 1980) is a Honduran former footballer.

Club career
Playing as a forward, Óscar Vargas debuted in Honduran football with Marathón in 2002. He was the revelation of the championship by scoring the fourth goal in the victory 4-1 of his team against Olimpia, in the first leg of the final of the 2001-02 Clausura. Subsequently, Vargas was crowned champion with the club. During his three years at Marathón, he won two more titles: 2002-03 Clausura and 2004-05 Apertura.

In 2006, he was transferred to Hispano. A year later, in 2007, returned to Marathón. In the 2008-09 Apertura, Óscar Vargas moved to Vida.

Personal life
He currently lives in the United States, working as a construction worker.

References

Honduran footballers
1980 births
Living people
Association football forwards
C.D. Marathón players